Emmanuel Atukwei Clottey (born 30 August 1987) is a Ghanaian professional footballer, who currently plays for Accra Great Olympics F.C. and the Ghana national team.

Career 
Clottey began his career with Brazil Academy and then later joined Mighty Victory Sporting Club, before signing with Great Olympics in 2004.

In 2007, Clottey was top goal scorer of the Ghana Premier League and moved in January on a 6-month loan to Austrian Football Bundesliga club FC Wacker Innsbruck, his first club in Europe. Clottey then joined OB on loan and made his debut as a substitute against FC Amager in the Ekstra bladet cup. He later returned to Great Olympics in January 2009 then again signed a contract on 9 April 2009 with Eleven Wise. In June 2010, Clottey joined Berekum Chelsea.

On 12 September 2012, after impressing in the 2012 CAF Champions League, Tunisian club Espérance de Tunis reached a deal with Berekum Chelsea to sign Clottey to a three-year contract, for an estimated transfer fee of $1.5 million.

On 18 June 2013, Clottey agreed a one-year loan move to the UAE Arabian Gulf League team Al Dhafra from Espérance. In January 2015, Clottey joined Asante Kotoko.

Career statistics

International appearances

Honours/Achievements

Club
Ghana Premier League: 2010–11

Individual
Top Scorer in the Ghana Premier League with 14 goals (2007)
Top Scorer in the CAF Champions League with 12 goals (2012)

References

External links
OB profile 
Career statistics at Danmarks Radio 
Scouting Talents Profile

1987 births
Living people
Association football forwards
Ghanaian footballers
Ghana international footballers
Odense Boldklub players
Danish Superliga players
FC Wacker Innsbruck (2002) players
Austrian Football Bundesliga players
Accra Great Olympics F.C. players
Sekondi Wise Fighters players
Tema Youth players
Berekum Chelsea F.C. players
Asante Kotoko S.C. players
Al Dhafra FC players
Ghana Premier League players
Espérance Sportive de Tunis players
Ghanaian expatriate footballers
Expatriate footballers in Austria
Expatriate footballers in Tunisia
Expatriate footballers in the United Arab Emirates
2011 African Nations Championship players
2013 Africa Cup of Nations players
UAE Pro League players
Ghanaian expatriate sportspeople in Tunisia
Ghanaian expatriate sportspeople in Austria
Ghanaian expatriate sportspeople in the United Arab Emirates
Ghanaian expatriate sportspeople in Denmark
Expatriate men's footballers in Denmark
Ghana A' international footballers
Ghana Premier League top scorers